Lionel Letizi (born 28 May 1973) is a former French professional footballer who played as a goalkeeper.

Club career

France
Born in Nice, Letizi took his first steps as a professional player with OGC Nice where his team won the French second division in 1994. Upon reaching the French first division he was observed by a number of football clubs before joining FC Metz in 1996. At this new club, he and his team became runner-ups in the French first division in 1998 and finalists of the French League Cup in 1999. The chance to take a step up arrived when he joined Paris Saint-Germain in 2000, which enabled him to play in the Champions’ League. He remained first choice at PSG for 6 years, but the signing of Mickael Landreau instigated his leave.

Move to Scotland
On 16 June 2006, he moved to Rangers FC on a free transfer.

On 13 August 2006, his blunder led directly to a 1–1 draw with Dunfermline. Letizi soon redeemed himself in the next game, which saw Rangers achieve a 2–0 win against the Hearts. Unfortunately for the team, this match resulted in an injury for Letizi. After two months on the sidelines, Letizi controversially made an automatic return to the side despite impressive performances from his replacement Allan McGregor.

Manager Paul Le Guen had made it clear at the start of the season that Letizi was going to be number one, which was not entirely unexpected. But the decision was soon put under dubious light when a fumble on the 14 October 2006 gave Inverness Caledonian Thistle an unforeseen 1–0 win at Ibrox Stadium, and left Rangers 10 points behind Celtic after just ten Scottish Premier League matches.

After the departure of Le Guen, Letizi's future at Rangers was uncertain, and not long after, he was released from the club on the 30 January 2007. Letizi has not played since October 2006 and featured in just eight matches in his six-month stay at Rangers.

International career
While capped four times for the French national team, he never managed to displace Fabien Barthez. He was in France's preliminary squad of 28 players for the 1998 FIFA World Cup in his native country. However, he was one of 6 players removed from the tournament by head coach Aime Jacquet just before the tournament began. France went on to be victorious in the tournament and become national heroes.

Trivia
His father Alain Letizi was also a goalkeeper and played for AS Cannes.

Honours

Club
Nice
 French second division champion: 1994

Metz
 Finalist of the French League Cup: 1999

Paris Saint-Germain
 UEFA Intertoto Cup: 2001

 French Cup: 2004, 2006

References

External links
 PSG profile 
 Career stats
 
 

Living people
1973 births
Footballers from Nice
Association football goalkeepers
French footballers
France international footballers
French expatriate footballers
Expatriate footballers in Scotland
OGC Nice players
FC Metz players
Paris Saint-Germain F.C. players
Rangers F.C. players
Ligue 1 players
Ligue 2 players
Scottish Premier League players
Footballers at the 1996 Summer Olympics
Olympic footballers of France
France youth international footballers